Jan Kodeš defeated Željko Franulović in the final, 6–2, 6–4, 6–0 to win the men's singles tennis title at the 1970 French Open.

Rod Laver was the defending champion, but did not compete this year.

Seeds
The seeded players are listed below. Jan Kodeš is the champion; others show the round in which they were eliminated.

  Ilie Năstase (quarterfinals)
  Stan Smith (first round)
  Manuel Santana (fourth round)
  Arthur Ashe (quarterfinals)
  Željko Franulović (final)
  Bob Hewitt (second round)
  Jan Kodeš (champion)
  Cliff Richey (semifinals)
  Alex Metreveli (fourth round)
  Ion Țiriac (fourth round)
  François Jauffret (quarterfinals)
  Lew Hoad (fourth round)
  Manuel Orantes (fourth round)
  Georges Goven (semifinals)
  Ray Ruffels (third round)
  Dick Crealy (fourth round)

Qualifying

Draw

Key
 Q = Qualifier
 WC = Wild card
 LL = Lucky loser
 r = Retired

Finals

Section 1

Section 2

Section 3

Section 4

Section 5

Section 6

Section 7

Section 8

External links
 Association of Tennis Professionals (ATP) – 1970 French Open Men's Singles draw
1970 French Open – Men's draws and results at the International Tennis Federation

Men's Singles
1970
1970 Grand Prix (tennis)